Garós is a locality located in the municipality of Naut Aran, in Province of Lleida province, Catalonia, Spain. As of 2020, it has a population of 136.

Geography 
Garós is located 166km north of Lleida.

References

Populated places in the Province of Lleida